Babyface or Baby Face can refer to:

Nicknames
 Lester Joseph Gillis a.k.a. Baby Face Nelson, an infamous 1930s bank robber
 Roosevelt "Baby Face" Willette (1933–1971), an American hard bop and soul-jazz musician
 "Baby Face", Jimmy McLarnin (1907–2004), two-time welterweight boxing world champion
 "Baby Face", the Baldwin DR-4-4-15 locomotive

In music
 Babyface (musician), real name Kenneth Edmonds, an American R&B and pop songwriter, record producer and singer
 "Baby Face" (song), 1926 song with music by Harry Akst and lyrics by Benny Davis, sung by Jan Garber the same year
 "Babyface" (song), a song by U2
 Babyface, rhythm guitarist for Thee Faction
 "Baby Face", a song by Jolin Tsai for the 2000 album Show Your Love
 Babyface, the former name of rock band Axe (band)

Fictional characters
 Baby-Face Finster, a criminal disguised as a baby in the Merrie Melodies animated short film Baby Buggy Bunny
 Babyface, a character in the movie Toy Story
 Baby Face Finlayson, a character in the British comic The Beano
 Baby Face, a character in the video game Dynamite Headdy
 Babyface Beagle, one of the Beagle Boys from the Scrooge McDuck universe
 Baby Face Gang, a literally baby-faced gang boss from the television series Batman: The Brave and the Bold
 Baby Face, a character in the movie The Hills Run Red from 2009
 Baby Face, a character in the movie and musicals Bugsy Malone

Other uses
 Baby Face (film), a 1933 film starring Barbara Stanwyck
 Baby Face (toy), an American brand of baby dolls that were manufactured by Galoob in 1990–1991
 Face (professional wrestling), or babyface, a wrestler or character who is portrayed as a "good guy" 
 A face displaying cuteness
 A face displaying neoteny

See also
 Baby-faced Assassin (disambiguation)
 "Babyface Killer", nickname of Chow Yun-fat (born 1955), Hong Kong actor
 "The Baby-Faced Assassin", nickname of Ole Gunnar Solskjær (born 1973), Norwegian football manager and former player, the latter mainly with Manchester United